The 1949 FAI Cup Final was the final match of the 1948–49 FAI Cup, a knock-out association football competition contested annually by clubs affiliated with the Football Association of Ireland. It took place on Sunday 10 April 1949 at Dalymount Park in Dublin, and was contested by Dundalk and Shelbourne. Dundalk won 3–0 to win their second FAI Cup.

Background
Both sides had finished level on 23 points in the League – six points behind champions Drumcondra. Shelbourne had defeated Dundalk to win the League of Ireland Shield earlier in the season, and defeated non-League Freebooters, St Patrick's Athletic and Waterford to make the final.

Dundalk had won the season opening Dublin City Cup the previous September, topping its league format unbeaten, which was their first trophy since 1942–43. To reach the final they had defeated Cork Athletic (4–1), had a bye in the next round, then defeated Drumcondra in the semi-final (2–1 in a replay following a 2–2 draw). The two sides went into the match with identical records in previous FAI Cup finals - one win and three defeats apiece.

Match

Summary
A close match between "two of the most consistent sides of the season", was expected to "rise above the average" in previews. It lived up to the billing, being described afterwards as "the best final at Dalymount Park for many years". The match was evenly contested throughout, with both sides creating chances. But Dundalk were defensively sound, and took their chances against a more nervous Shelbourne defence. They took the lead through Jackie Walsh in the 20th minute, after Shelbourne had made most of the early play. Shelbourne then had a shot deflected onto the post by Mike Skivington, before Dundalk scored a second through Ronnie Henderson in the 41st minute. In the second half Arthur Fitzsimmons hit the crossbar, before Jackie Walsh headed home his second, and Dundalk's third, to seal their second FAI Cup win.

Details

References
Bibliography

Citations

FAI Cup finals
Fai Cup Final 1949
Fai Cup Final 1949
FAI Cup Final, 1949
FAI Cup Final